L. Q. Ivy was seventeen-year-old African-American male who was  accused of raping a White woman in 1925 in Rocky Ford, Mississippi. He was tortured and burned to death in 1925 by a lynch mob of White people.

Accusation and search for attacker 
In September 1925, Bessie Gaines, a 21-year-old White single mother, was raped and severely beaten in Rocky Ford (now known as Etta, Mississippi).  A neighbor drove her to the nearest hospital in New Albany, where Union County sheriff John Roberts interviewed her and her family. The sheriff assembled a posse of White men, who used bloodhounds to search for her attacker. The dogs led them to a group of Black timber-cutters, including Cleveland Jones, Sherill Kilpatrick, Spencer Ivy, and L. Q. Ivy.

According to a LaReeca Rucker, interviews on file at the University of Mississippi, "...provided additional information about the lynching. Those interviewed said Rush Scott, one of the members of the posse that the sheriff deputized to search for Gaines' assailant, told police that from the time the black suspects were dropped off at the logging field, and the time Gaines said the rape occurred, it would have been impossible for anyone to travel on foot the two and a half miles to the cornfield where she was attacked. He also reportedly remarked that he saw the white driver of a gas truck from New Albany, moving across the cornfield."

Arrest, mob gathering 
For unknown reasons, the sheriff settled on L. Q. Ivy as the likely culprit, and he was arrested, transported to the hospital in New Albany, and presented to Gaines. She was unable to definitively identify Ivy as her attacker. There are conflicting accounts  whether L.Q. Ivy confessed to Sheriff Roberts.  Sheriff Roberts did not hold Ivy in the New Albany jail, but secretly moved him to Aberdeen.

A large crowd gathered outside the New Albany courthouse. 

Mayor J.E. Tate, Judge Thomas Pegram, and the sheriff urged calm, and sheriff's deputies confiscated a large number of weapons. New Albany native and U.S. senator Hubert Stephens attempted to get the mob to disperse. The crowd dispersed after it was revealed that the Sheriff had secreted Ivy "down the river".

Failed identification 
That night, a group of men led by Billy Preston entered the home of Judge Pegram, and coerced him into writing a writ to produce Ivy at the hospital on Monday. Sheriff Roberts attempted to defeat the mob by bringing Ivy to the hospital on Sunday morning instead, where he was presented to Bessie Gaines for identification. Gaines could not definitively identify Ivy as the perpetrator, but stated "I'm not sure but he looks like the man." Upon leaving, Preston and the mob accosted the sheriff outside the hospital. The victim's father, Bob Gaines, distracted the crowd by shouting that Bessie was not sure, and asked the crowd not to take hasty action. Roberts, along with the sheriff from Aberdeen, took advantage of the distraction to attempt to hustle Ivy away from the scene.

Vigilante torture 
Instead, Union County Sheriff John Roberts took custody of Ivy and attempted to drive him to Holly Springs, leaving behind two deputies to block the mob from following. Under armed threats from the mob, the deputies allowed them to pass, then the sheriff faced a roadblock from the vigilantes. At this point, the sheriff relinquished Ivy into the hands of the mob, just outside the city limits of Myrtle. The mob took him to a location in Rocky Ford, where they tortured him with knives and with fire, dangling him from a rafter. While Ivy continued to maintain his innocence through torture, a larger mob, estimated at 400 gathered. 

This mob built a pyre. The mob stripped Ivy, drove a Model T axle into the ground and chained him to it. He was tortured with a blowtorch and lemon squeezers, which were used to squash his testicles into a bloody pulp. They piled crates soaked with kerosene around him. When it was apparent that he would be burned, some sources state that Ivy confessed. According to one source, "Ivy confessed that he was the lone assailant, probably because he wanted to spare the three other African American men who were being held in connection with the attack."  After considerable torture, three men stepped forward and set fire to the crates. According to journalist Roulhac, who witnessed the event, Ivy shouted more than once as he burned to death, "Have mercy, I didn't do it. I didn't do it."  After Ivy died and the stench became objectionable, more wood was added to the fire to completely consume the body.

Witness account 
J.L. Roulhac, a reporter for the Memphis Press-Scimitar witnessed the attack on Ivy first hand, and along with three pictures taken of the murder, published this account: "I watched a negro burned at the stake at Rocky Ford, Mississippi Sunday afternoon. I watched an angry mob chain him to an iron stake. I watched them pile wood around his helpless body. I watched them pour gasoline on this wood. And I watched three men set this wood on fire. I stood in a crowd of 600 people as the flames gradually crept nearer and nearer to the helpless negro. I watched the blaze climb higher and higher, encircling him without mercy. I heard his cry of agony as the flames reached him and set his clothing on fire. "Oh God; Oh, God!" he shouted. "I didn't do it. Have mercy!" The blaze leaped higher. The negro struggled. He kicked the chain loose from his ankles, but it held his waist and neck against the iron post that was becoming red with the intense heat. "Have mercy, I didn't do it, I didn't do it." he shouted again. "You should have thought of this before." someone shouted from the crowd. There was an instant of silence. Then several voices rose in agreement. Nowhere was there a sign of mercy among the members of the mob, nor did they seem to regret the horrible thing they had done. The negro had supposedly sinned against their race and died a death of torture."

Aftermath 
After Ivy was completely burned on the pyre, the mob left, and many complained that they would have to go to New Albany to eat, since the crowd had eaten all the food locally. Sheriff Roberts stated he expected no further violence, and claimed that he did not recognize any members of the mob. The mob was so confident that they would not face any repercussions for their actions, they made no attempt to conceal their identities, and even posed for pictures.

References

1925 in Mississippi
1925 murders in the United States
September 1925 events
African-American history of Mississippi
Crimes in Mississippi
Deaths by person in Mississippi
Lynching deaths in Mississippi
Racially motivated violence against African Americans
Racially motivated violence in the United States